The 32nd Annual TV Week Logie Awards was held on Friday 9 March 1990 at the Hyatt on Collins in Melbourne, and broadcast on the Ten Network. The ceremony was hosted by Mark Mitchell and guests included Ernest Borgnine, John Travolta, Pauline Collins, John Alderton, Sigrid Thornton and Dame Edna Everage.

Nominees and winners
Winners are listed first and highlighted in bold.

Gold Logie

Acting/Presenting

Most Popular Programs/Videos

Most Outstanding Programs

Performers
James Morrison
Gerry Connolly

Hall of Fame
After a lifetime in the Australian television industry, Johnny Young became the seventh inductee into the TV Week Logies Hall of Fame.

References

External links
 

1990 television awards
1990 in Australian television
1990